The Nilgiri Express (Also known as the Blue Mountain Express, or Nilagiri Express) is a night express train service operating between Chennai Central and Mettupalayam, Coimbatore in Tamil Nadu, India. It is operated by Indian Railways.

Introduction
This train is named after the Nilgiri (Tamil : English - (Nil - Blue; giri - Mountain)) Hills. The train is primarily intended for travellers to these hills, especially to the towns of Ooty, Coonoor and Kotagiri. Mettupalayam is near Coimbatore, which is at the foot of these hills, and the Nilgiri Express links to the Nilagiri passenger train operated by the Nilgiri Mountain Railway (NMR) at Mettupalayam railway station, enabling passengers to complete the journey to Udagamandalam by rail.
The Nilgiri Express started to connect Coimbatore to Beypore on 12 May 1862 owing to track completion between Salem & Coimbatore whose completion lead it run as Salem Beypore Ordinary Service. Later it connect Madras to Beypore with through Coach attached at Podanur towards Beypore. Owing to low traffic, Beypore Mail service was discontinued till Calicut was connected in 1888 to Madras (Podanur Beypoor Mail was named Malabar Express in 1907 when Mangalore was connected to Madras).
Nilgiri Express termed as Blue Mountain use to cover Madras to Mettupalayam & acts as link to MG  Blue Mountain Express for Ooty with through Coach attached to Podanur Calicut Mail. Madras Ooty Through Timings were:- Madras 21.00; Ooty 10.20 & in return:- Ooty 16.30; Madras 05.50. It still exist past NMR UNESCO World Heritage Tag in 1994 with Ooty Mettupalayam Passenger acts as connecting train.
Nilgiri Express use to be main portion of Bangalore Mail, Island Express, Malabar Express & Bombay-Coimbatore (Through Coach bifurcate/amalgamate to Madras-Bombay Mail).

Rake till 1997-98
This train had a dark blue colored rake with white stripes above and below the windows, distinctly spottable from other trains till 1997/98 when all the other trains had maroon/brick colored coaches. When the rake color of the other train changed for conversion to Vacuum brakes even this train got the same color as the other trains.

Train Numbers
There is a daily overnight service in both directions. Train number 12671 runs from Chennai Central to Mettupalayam, while train number 12672 runs from Mettupalayam to Chennai Central. This train is maintained at Basin Bridge Junction Railway Yard, Chennai. This train has a dedicated rake with no Rake sharing.

Stops and Distance Covered
 MGR Chennai Central 
Arakkonam Junction 
 Katpadi Junction
 Salem Junction 
 Erode Junction 
 Tiruppur 
 Coimbatore North Junction
 Coimbatore Junction 
 Mettupalayam

Booking Quota
The train is intended for travellers to and from the Nilgiris District of Tamil Nadu. Though the train does not enter the district, the main towns in the Nilgiris have designated seats and berths on this train allocated for sale at local booking offices. Ooty, Coonoor, Wellington, Aruvankadu, Ketti, Kotagiri and Gudalur all have this provision. Notably, the latter two do not even have any rail connectivity.

Loco Links
The train is hauled by an Erode Junction(ED) WAP7 or Arakkonam Junction(AJJ) WAP4 or a Royapuram(RPM) WAP7 electric locomotive from MGR Chennai Central(MAS) to Mettupalayam(MTP) and the return journey. At Coimbatore Junction(CBE), there is a loco & rake reversal. The Coimbatore-Mettupalayam stretch was electrified in 2007, and the same locomotive is used to haul the train in this section in both directions.

See also
 Nilgiri Mountain Railway
 Rail transport in India

References

External links
Nilgiri Express Route

Transport in Chennai
Named passenger trains of India
Rail transport in Tamil Nadu
Express trains in India